The Better Day World Tour was the tenth concert tour by American recording artist, Dolly Parton. Visiting North America, Europe and Australia, the tour supported her 41st studio album, Better Day. With nearly 275,000 tickets sold, and an overall gross of $34 million, it is Parton's most successful tour. The tour was her first visit to Australia in 30 years.

Background
In January 2011, Parton told media outlet she planned to release an album in 2011 and a supporting tour. A month later, British webzine Glasswerk announced the tour to visit Scotland, England and Ireland. In March, the tour was expanded to include dates in the United States. Parton explained the tour would be a joyful celebration full of hope and inspires to look towards better days. To introduce the tour, Parton remarks:"I’m very excited, first of all, to be going back on tour at all. But I love the fans and I miss the live stage shows. With the new stage show I hope to have a lot of new things for the fans, especially all the new songs from the Better Day CD and some new and different segments in the show with a lot more fun things as well."

The tour began on July 17, 2011, at the Thompson–Boling Arena in Knoxville, Tennessee. The inaugural concert benefited Parton's Dollywood Foundation. All proceeds from the concert were donated to the Imagination Library, providing educational opportunities to children in various communities.

Broadcasts & Recordings

Footage was recorded on 22–23 November 2011 at Rod Laver Arena, Melbourne, Australia for a live DVD. The release date has not been announced although Liquid Crystal Productions has stated it will be released in 2013.

Set list
This set list is representative of the show in Knoxville, Tennessee. It is not representative of all concerts for the duration of the tour

"Walking on Sunshine" (contains excerpts from "Shine Like the Sun")
"Better Get to Livin'"
"Jolene"
"Rocky Top"
"Mule Skinner Blues"
"Help!"
"Shine"
"Stairway to Heaven"
"My Tennessee Mountain Home"
"Precious Memories"
"Coat of Many Colors"
"Smoky Mountain Memories"
"Son of a Preacher Man"
"Better Day"
"Together You and I"
"Holding Everything"
"Joyful Noise"
"He Will Take You Higher" (contains excerpts from "I Want to Take You Higher")
"He's Everything"
"White Limozeen"
"The Best of Both Worlds"
"The Sacrifice"
"In the Meantime"
"Little Sparrow"
"River Deep – Mountain High"
"Here You Come Again
"Islands in the Stream"
"9 to 5"
Encore
"I Will Always Love You"
"Light of a Clear Blue Morning"

Source:

Tour dates

Box office score data

References

External links
Parton's Official Website

Dolly Parton concert tours
2011 concert tours